Peter Matz (November 6, 1928 – August 9, 2002) was an American musician, composer, arranger and conductor. His musical career in film, theater, television and studio recording spanned fifty years, and he worked with a number of prominent artists, including Marlene Dietrich, Noël Coward and Barbra Streisand. Matz won three Emmys and a Grammy Award and is best known for his work on Streisand's early albums as well as for his work as the orchestral conductor and musical director for The Carol Burnett Show.

Biography
Peter Matz was born in Pittsburgh, Pennsylvania, on November 6, 1928, to Louis N. Matz and Alice (née Krieger) Matz. He studied Chemical Engineering at the University of California, Los Angeles, but after playing woodwinds in local dance bands to support himself, he soon realised that music was his real vocation.

After graduating Matz spent two years in Paris studying piano and music theory. In 1954, he returned to New York and acquired a job as a rehearsal pianist for Harold Arlen and Truman Capote's Broadway musical House of Flowers. Recognizing Matz's talent, Arlen broadened his scope, and Matz arranged and conducted the music for several of the show's dance sequences. Later, Arlen commissioned Matz to write the vocal, dance music and orchestration arrangements for his musical, Jamaica. Impressed with Matz, Arlen began recommending him to others, including cabaret artist Marlene Dietrich.

In 1955, Dietrich recommended Matz to Noël Coward when the English playwright, actor and singer was scheduled to perform in Las Vegas, but without his accompanist Norman Hackforth who had been denied a US work permit. Coward was impressed with Matz and described him as "quick, intelligent and a fine pianist". Matz went on to work with Coward on his albums, television specials and his musical Sail Away. In 1962, Matz was Musical Director for Richard Rodgers's Broadway musical No Strings, for which he received a Tony nomination.

In 1958, Matz married (Dolores) Janet Perry, with whom he had two children: Peter Zachary Matz and Jonas Christopher Matz; they were married 20 years. In 1981, Matz married Marilyn Lovell Matz, an actress and eventual AIDS activist. The couple remained together until Matz's death in 2002.

In the early 1960s, Matz began working with Barbra Streisand on her first album, which won several Grammy Awards and brought her stardom. He continued arranging and conducting on her next four albums and won a Grammy Award himself for her 1964 album, People. Later, Matz won an Emmy Award for her 1965 television special My Name Is Barbra, and an Oscar nomination for Best Original Score for her 1975 film Funny Lady. He won two more Emmys, for an episode of the TV series, Kraft Music Hall, and for an episode of The Carol Burnett Show. Matz was musical director for The Carol Burnett Show for eight seasons. Matz was the orchestra leader on Hullabaloo from January 1965 to August 1966.

Over the years, Matz worked with a number of prominent artists, including Burt Bacharach, Tony Bennett, Bing Crosby, Lena Horne, Peggy Lee, k.d. lang, Bette Midler, Rosemary Clooney, Liza Minnelli, Elaine Paige, Chicago, Dolly Parton, Dame Kiri Te Kanawa, Sarah Vaughan and Dionne Warwick. He also composed music for a number of films and television series. Toward the end of his career, Matz and his wife, singer Marilynn Lovell, gave a series of benefit concerts in Los Angeles for people with HIV/AIDS, for which he received a Special Los Angeles City Council Award. In mid-2002 he finished his last work, the arrangements for the Symphony Pop Production My Paris for singer Tony Sandler.

Matz died of lung cancer on August 9, 2002. A memorial concert in his honor was held at the University of California, Los Angeles, on November 25, 2002 and featured, among others, Carol Burnett and Burt Bacharach.

Selected credits
Source: Film Reference 
Television series
Hullabaloo (1965–66) – music director
Kraft Music Hall (1967–71) – music director
The Carol Burnett Show (1971–78) – music director
Detective School (1979) – music composer and director
Amanda's (1983) – theme music composer
Mama's Family (1983) – theme music composer
Television specials
My Name Is Barbra (1965) – music director
Color Me Barbra (1966) – music director
On The Flip Side (1967) - conductor and arranger
Once Upon a Mattress (1972) – music director
Eunice (1982) – music composer
The Carol Burnett Show: A Reunion (1993) – conductor and arranger
Carol Burnett: The Special Years (1994) – conductor
Films
Bye Bye Braverman (1968) – music composer and director
Marlowe (1969) – music composer and director
Rivals (1972) – music composer
Funny Lady (1975) – music adapter, arranger and conductor
Alice in Wonderland (1976) – music director
The Call of the Wild (1976) – music composer
The Great Houdini (1976) – music composer
The Last Hurrah (1977) – music composer
The Man in the Santa Claus Suit (1979) – music composer
White Mama (1980) – music composer
The Private Eyes (1980) – music composer and director
Lust in the Dust (1985) – music composer and director
Torch Song Trilogy (1988) – music adapter
Stepping Out (1991) – music composer
Theater
Sail Away (1961–62) – musical director and dance arranger
No Strings (1962) – musical director, conductor, and dance arranger
The Boys from Syracuse (1963) – ballet music composer
Hallelujah, Baby! (1967) – orchestrator
Girl Crazy (1985) – orchestrator
Grand Hotel (1989) – orchestrator
Albums
Noel Coward at Las Vegas (1955–56) – arranger and conductor (recorded live in 1955 at the Desert Inn, Las Vegas, and in 1956 at a New York recording studio)
Noel Coward in New York (1956) – arranger and conductor
The Barbra Streisand Album (1963) – arranger and conductor
The Second Barbra Streisand Album (1963) – arranger and conductor
People (1964) – arranger and conductor
Liza! Liza! (1964) – arranger and conductor
Second to None (Carmen McRae) (1964) – arranger and conductor
Tom Jones the Musical (1964) - arranger and conductor
Ruth Brown '65 (Mainstream, 1965) – arranger and conductor
Color Me Barbra (1966) – arranger and conductor
It Amazes Me (1965) – arranger and conductor
Peter Matz Brings 'Em Back (1967) - arranger and conductorTony Bennett: Tony Sings the Songs of Today! (1969) – arranger and conductorThe Ethel Merman Disco Album (1979) – arranger, conductor, and producerThe Broadway Album (1985) – arranger, conductor, and producerSamuel Ramey Sings Rodgers and Hammerstein (1989) – arranger and conductorMelissa Manchester:Tribute (1989) – arranger, conductor, and producerListen to My Heart'' (1995) – arranger and conductor

Awards

References

External links

 
 Tom Jones the Musical full album audio at Internet Archive

1928 births
2002 deaths
American male conductors (music)
American male composers
American music arrangers
20th-century American Jews
Deaths from lung cancer in California
Musicians from Pittsburgh
Musicians from Los Angeles
UCLA Henry Samueli School of Engineering and Applied Science alumni
20th-century American pianists
20th-century American composers
American male pianists
Classical musicians from California
Classical musicians from Pennsylvania
20th-century American conductors (music)
20th-century American male musicians
21st-century American Jews